Quisling is a term meaning "traitor". Quisling may also refer to
Vidkun Quisling, 20th century Norwegian politician and traitor 
Maria Quisling, Vikdun Quisling's wife
Quisling residence Villa Grande, Vikdun Quisling's former home
Quisling regime, the Nazi-controlled puppet government of Norway in World War II

Erik Quisling (born 1971), American author, musician, filmmaker and entrepreneur
Quisling Towers Apartments in Madison, Wisconsin, USA